Guzaliya Gafurova (born 23 August 1992) is a Kazakhstani karateka. She won the gold medal in the women's kumite 68 kg event at the Asian Games both in 2014 and 2018. In both finals she earned her victory by defeating Tang Lingling of China.

In 2015, she won the silver medal in the women's kumite 68 kg event at the Asian Karate Championships held in Yokohama, Japan.

Achievements

References

External links 
 

Living people
1992 births
Place of birth missing (living people)
Kazakhstani female karateka
Karateka at the 2014 Asian Games
Karateka at the 2018 Asian Games
Asian Games medalists in karate
Asian Games gold medalists for Kazakhstan
Medalists at the 2014 Asian Games
Medalists at the 2018 Asian Games
21st-century Kazakhstani women